The David Fisher House, at 124 E. 400 South in Heber City, Utah, was built in 1892 in Queen Anne style.  It was listed on the National Register of Historic Places in 1980.

It is a one-and-a-half-story brick house, "one of only a handful of Victorian Houses remaining in Wasatch County."

It was built by David Fisher, born in 1852 in Scotland, who lived in the house until his death in 1915.

References

National Register of Historic Places in Wasatch County, Utah
Victorian architecture in Utah
Queen Anne architecture in Utah
Houses completed in 1892